Haarlem railway station is located in Haarlem in North Holland, Netherlands. The station opened at September 20, 1839, on the Amsterdam–Rotterdam railway, the first railway line in the Netherlands. The station building itself is a rijksmonument.

History
The original, wooden station was built on the Oude Weg, just outside the Amsterdamse Poort in 1839 to accommodate the passengers of the first railway in the Netherlands between Haarlem and Amsterdam. This had a broad gauge rail width of the Dutch broad gauge . The station was built outside the city, on the current location of the Centrale Werkplaats (maintenance depot) of the Hollandsche IJzeren Spoorweg-Maatschappij.

The train engine "De Snelheid" was the twin of the Amsterdam "Arend", which along with the carriages, were designed by Stephenson's apprentice, the English rail engineer Thomas Longridge Gooch of R.B. Longridge & Co. There were 4 trains per day to Amsterdam, scheduled at 9:00, 14:00, 16:00, and 18:00. The prices of the tickets for 1st (closed carriage), 2nd, and 3rd class (charabanc) were 1.20, 80c, and 40c (guilders).

Within a few years the new railway turned out to be a great success, and in 1842 a permanent station was built on the current location. It was designed by Frederick Willem Conrad in a semi-Greek neo-classicistic style. The front of the building was open to the street.

Mouthaan
In 1867 the station was re-designed by P.J. Mouthaan. An extra floor was put on the building and the front of the building was enclosed.

Current station
The current building was built between 1906 and 1908. The design is by the railway station specialist Dirk Margadant (1849-1915). The tracks were elevated, to avoid conflict with the traffic in the city. It is the only train station in the Netherlands that is built in Art Nouveau style.

Train services

As of 9 December 2018, the following services call at Haarlem:

International rail

National rail

Bus services

Gallery

Trivia

The scenes in the 2004 film Ocean's Twelve that are meant to portray Amsterdam Centraal station were actually shot on platform 3a at Haarlem station.

References

External links

NS website 
Dutch public transport travel planner 
Connexxion website 
Haarlem Shuffle - Central Railway Station

Railway stations in North Holland
Railway stations in the Netherlands opened in 1839
Railway stations on the Oude Lijn
Buildings and structures completed in 1908
Rijksmonuments in Haarlem
Buildings and structures in Haarlem
Railway
Art Nouveau railway stations
1839 establishments in the Netherlands